ζ Fornacis (often Latinised as Zeta Fornacis) is the Bayer designation for a star in the southern constellation of Fornax. It is faintly visible to the naked eye with an apparent visual magnitude of 5.67. The star is drifting further away with a radial velocity of +29 km/s. Positioned about 1.3° to the southeast of Zeta Fornacis is the galaxy NGC 1232.

This is an F-type main-sequence star with a stellar classification of F4 V. With an estimated age of 1.5 billion years, it has 1.8 times the mass of the Sun and 1.6 times the Sun's radius. It is spinning with a projected rotational velocity of 84.9 km/s, and has a near-solar metallicity—what astronomers term the abundance of elements other than hydrogen and helium. This star is a probable member of the Hyades Stream—a group of stars that share a common motion through space with the Hyades cluster.

Zeta Fornacis has a common proper motion companion, NLTT 9563, a magnitude 13.50 star with a classification of M 2.5. As of 2004, this companion was positioned at an angular separation of 176.1 arcseconds along a position angle of 288.1°.

References

F-type main-sequence stars
Double stars
Hyades Stream
Fornax (constellation)
Fornacis, Zeta
CD-25 1191
018692
13942
901